WrestleReunion (or Wrestle Reunion) is a professional wrestling event, and fan convention, founded by Sal Corrente in 2005.

WrestleReunion 1
The first WrestleReunion event occurred January 29, 2005, at Doubletree Hotel in Tampa, Florida. The attendance was 450.

Appearing at the convention were: Bill Alfonso, Bill Apter, Nick Bockwinkel, Jack Brisco, Buddy Colt, Ted DiBiase, Hector Guerrero, Jimmy Hart, Scott Hudson, Lex Luger, Kevin Nash, Diamond Dallas Page, Kimberly Page, Tom Prichard, Harley Race, Scotty Riggs, Lance Russell, Sabu, Bruno Sammartino, Nitro Girl Spice, Ricky Steamboat, Les Thatcher, Bill Watts, Jake Roberts and Steve Williams.

  Rocky Johnson was scheduled to be the partner for Roddy Piper and Jimmy Valiant, but was replaced by Jimmy Snuka.
 Other participants in  battle royal: Bob Armstrong, Ronnie Garvin, Brad Armstrong, Jake Roberts, Shane Douglas, Virgil, Thunderfoot #2, Thunderfoot #1, Hack Meyers, Samu, Scott Armstrong, Adrian Street, Chavo Guerrero, The Warlord, and Bugsy McGraw

WrestleReunion 2
The event was dedicated to Bruno Sammartino.

WrestleReunion 2 took place from August 26–28, 2005, at the Valley Forge Convention Center in Philadelphia, Pennsylvania. The attendance was 900.

Appearing at the convention were: Afa, Bill Apter, Nick Bockwinkel, Jeremy Borash, J. J. Dillon, Stan Hansen, Bret Hart, Jimmy Hart, Ivory, Balls Mahoney, Jim Molineaux, Tom Prichard, Harley Race, Wendi Richter, Lance Russell, Sumi Sakai, Sandman, Larry Sharpe, Joey Styles, Tammy Lynn Sytch, Nikolai Volkoff, and Dick Whoerle.

WrestleReunion 3
WrestleReunion 3 took place on September 10, 2005 at The Davie Bergeron Rodeo Arena in Davie, Florida.
The attendance was 550.

When Legends Collide

WrestleReunion 4
WrestleReunion 4 took place from January 29 to 31, 2010, at the LAX Hilton in Los Angeles, California.

Appearing at the convention were: Austin Idol, Bruno Sammartino, Demolition, Diamond Dallas Page, Jushin Thunder Liger, Koko B. Ware, Larry Zbyszko, The Great Muta, Nick Bockwinkel, Road Warrior Animal, Rob Van Dam, Scott Taylor, Stan Hansen, Tammy Lynn Sytch, Super Crazy, Terri Runnels, Bret Hart, Chavo Guerrero, Dan Severn, Daffney, Jimmy Hart, J. J. Dillon, Ron Simmons, Kishi, Rock Riddle, The Iron Sheik.

SoCal Showdown

Presented by Ring of Honor on January 29, 2010

Kurt RusselReunion

Presented by Pro Wrestling Guerrilla on January 30, 2010. This event aired on pay-per-view.

WrestleReunion 5
WrestleReunion 5 took place from January 28 to 30, 2011, at the LAX Hilton in Los Angeles, California.

Appearing at the convention are:
Mike Graham, Paul Orndorff, Tito Santana, Mr. Saito, Mr. Fuji, Bob Orton Jr, SoCal Val, Traci Brooks, Ryan Shamrock, Terry Funk, Ken Patera, Tatanka, Savio Vega, Val Venis, Gene Okerlund, Barry Orton, Roddy Piper, Tammy Lynn Sytch, Serena Deeb, Shane Douglas, The Powers of Pain (The Barbarian and The Warlord), Billy Anderson, Torrie Wilson, Nick Mitchell, Superstar Billy Graham, Hart Foundation (Bret Hart, Jim Neidhart, Jimmy Hart), Danny Davis, Vampiro, Christy Hemme, Hurricane Helms, Mr. Águila, Mil Mascaras, Dos Caras, Jake Roberts, Chavo Guerrero, Mando Guerrero, Harley Race

SoCal Showdown II

Presented by Ring of Honor on January 28, 2011:

Kurt RussellReunion II: The Reunioning

Presented by Pro Wrestling Guerrilla on January 29, 2011:

WrestleReunion VI

WrestleReunion VI took place from January 27 to 29, 2012 at the LAX Westin Hotel in Los Angeles, California.  In addition to the autograph signings, live events were held by Dragon Gate USA, Pro Wrestling Guerrilla and Highspots.com, as well as "$5 Wrestling Live".

Open the Golden Gate

Present by Dragon Gate USA on January 27, 2012:

Pro Wrestling Superstars

Presented by Highspots.com and WrestleReunion on January 28, 2012:

Kurt RussellReunion III

Presented by Pro Wrestling Guerrilla on January 29, 2012:

See also
List of professional wrestling conventions
Pro Wrestling Guerrilla
Ring of Honor
World Wrestling Legends
World Xtreme Wrestling

References

External links

WrestleReunion I information
WrestleReunion I information (2)
WrestleReunion Photos

American professional wrestling promotions
Professional wrestling shows
2005 establishments in Florida
Defunct multigenre conventions
Defunct fan conventions
Professional wrestling conventions
Recurring events established in 2005